The  St. John the Baptist is a Roman Catholic Church situated in the locality of Permude, Mangalore taluk. This church is located on the way to Kateel from Bajpe. The church is devoted to St John the Baptist who is known for truth and justice.

History
In early days, most of the people in Permude were farmers and hard workers. Agriculture and dairy farming were the occupations of the people here during the early years. Permude had a nickname as Perda Mudde(Tulu Language) as production of milk was plenty during early time. Prior to foundation of this church the catholics around permude were part of Bajpe and Kalavaru. For spiritual needs, catholics of Permude were walking several miles to Bajpe or to Kalavaru as there were no other transport facility available. Meanwhile, catholic community realized the need of a church in Permude. During this time, John Baptist Balthazar Nazareth, a resident of Permude and by profession a coffee planter in Chikmagalur became sick. His wife Seraphine Nazareth vowed to build a church in Permude to get back her husband's good health. So Seraphine Nazareth started the construction of the church along with her daughter who looked up the responsibility of the church building and her son in law Albert Ambudias Rodrigues who extended his cooperation for the same. Three-fourths of the cost of the construction was shared by the founders and a quarter of the cost was borne by the parishioners by donating material and labour.

The foundation for the church  was laid on 25 November 1959 by the Bishop late Rev Dr Raymond D' Mello. The church was consecrated on 16 May 1963 as per church records. As per the official records in Roman Catholic Diocese of Mangalore, Permude parish was formed on 24 October 1965 after separating from Bajpe and Kalavaru parishes. Late Fr Jacob Crasta was the first priest of this church.

The church was devoted to St John the Baptist who is known for truth and justice as it was built in the memory of John Baptist Balthazar Nazareth. Until Kateel parish was formed, this parish served the spiritual needs of catholics around Permude, Kateel and Ekkaru. When Kateel parish was formed in 1971, the catholic families from Kateel to Ekkaru joined Kateel parish. This parish has given several priests and nuns who are serving the spiritual needs.

Golden jubilee of this parish was celebrated on 13 January 2016.

Demographics

The parish has 180 families with a population of 826 members as of November 2015.

Administration
Since its inception, eleven parish priests have served here. Their names  are as below.
Fr. Jacob S Crasta
Fr. Edwin Pinto
Fr. Hilary Sanctis
Fr. Henry Fernandes
Fr. Vernon Vas
Fr. Denis Moras Prabhu
Fr. Victor George Dsouza
Fr. Peter Theodore Dsouza
Fr. Richard Lasrado
Fr. Oswald Lasrado
Fr. Valerian Rodrigues
Fr. Edwin Vincent Correa (current parish priests and vicar)

See also
Roman Catholicism in Mangalore
Goan Catholics
Deanery of Belthangady
Christianity in Karnataka
Most Holy Redeemer Church, Belthangady
St. Patrick Church, Siddakatte

References

External links

Churches in Mangalore Diocese
Roman Catholic churches completed in 1963
Christian organizations established in 1965